Beech Ridge is a ridge located in Greene County, New York southwest of Lexington, New York. Located to the northwest is Vly Mountain and to the north of Vinegar Hill. Beech Ridge drains north into Beech Ridge Brook, east into West Kill and south into Condon Hollow.

References

Mountains of Greene County, New York
Mountains of New York (state)